John M. Green (Australian author) (born 1953) is an Australian thriller writer, publisher and company director.  He is a former executive director of an investment bank and was a partner of two law firms. Previously a director of publisher UNSW Press, he co-founded Pantera Press, which published his first novel Nowhere Man. Green has also written for publications such as The Australian Financial Review and The Australian. As a company director, he is Deputy Chairman of QBE Insurance and a Councillor of the National Library of Australia.

Green lives in Sydney. His wife, Jenny Green, is a sculptor.

In 2016, both Green and his wife were awarded UNSW Alumni Achievement Awards for their contributions to Arts and Culture.

Bibliography
Nowhere Man (2010)
Born to Run (2011)
The Trusted (2013)
The Tao Deception (2016)

Pantera Press
Green co-founded award-winning book publisher Pantera Press in 2008 with his daughter Alison Green. Pantera released its first titles in 2010 and has published authors such as Sulari Gentill. It has partnered with several charities and organizations, and was a finalist for the Small Publisher of the Year award through the Australian Publishers Association in 2013. Alison Green was recognized in 2016 in the Westpac/Australian Financial Review 100 Women of Influence Awards for Pantera Press's cross-pollination between business and social good.

Philanthropy
Green is a philanthropist in the arts and education including through Pantera Press. When a lawyer, he also did pro bono legal work at Redfern Legal Centre.

He has also been a director of the Macquarie Group Foundation, the General Sir John Monash Foundation, the Children's Hospital at Westmead, Asthma NSW and other philanthropic and service organisations.

Corporate career
Green is currently Deputy Board Chairman of global insurance firm, QBE Insurance, a member of the Australian Institute of Company Directors Corporate Governance Committee, and a director of publisher, Pantera Press. He was a board member of global professional services firm WorleyParsons and of book publisher UNSW Press, a Council Member of the National Library of Australia, and a member of the Australian Takeovers Panel. His executive career was as an investment banker, an executive director at Macquarie Group and, before that, as a partner in two law firms now known as Ashurst LLP and Herbert Smith Freehills.  The bio in his novel, "The Tao Deception"  states he is (or at that time (2016) was) a board member of the Australian Centre for Independent Studies, a Libertarian think tank.

Student life
In 1974, Green was elected full-time president of the University of New South Wales Student Union (now Arc @ UNSW Limited). He was also a Member of the University of New South Wales Council, a president of the UNSW Jazz Society and a vice-president of the UNSW Law Society. At Canterbury Boys' High School, Green was editor of the student newspaper, Graffiti, and was a promoter and booking agent for pop and rock bands.

References

External links
 Pantera Press

Australian company founders
Australian writers
1953 births
Living people
National Library of Australia Council members